George F. MacDonald (July 4, 1938 - January 22, 2020) was a Canadian anthropologist and museum director who pioneered archaeological and ethnohistorical research on the Tsimshian and Gitksan and was the director of the Canadian Museum of Civilization from 1983 to 1998.

MacDonald was born in Cambridge, Ontario. A graduate of the University of Toronto (1961: B.A. (Honours) in Anthropology) and of Yale University (Ph.D. in Anthropology), he is the author of several scholarly publications.  He joined what was then called the Canadian Museum of Man in 1960 as Atlantic Provinces Archaeologist.

MacDonald oversaw the transition of the museum to its new facility in Gatineau, Quebec, and its reorientation to a more modern, populist form of exhibit.  Inspired as much by the ideas of Marshall Mcluhan and Disney's Epcot Center as by other museums like the Smithsonian Institution, MacDonald's version of the museum included interactive displays, replicas, and an IMAX theatre.

Notes

Works

 MacDonald, George F. (1983, 2015) Haida Monumental Art: Villages of the Queen Charlotte Islands. Vancouver: University of British Columbia Press.
 MacDonald, George F. (1996), Haida Art , University of Washington Press. 
 MacDonald, George F., and John J. Cove (eds.) (1987) Tsimshian Narratives.  2 vols.  Ottawa: Directorate, Canadian Museum of Civilization.

External links
 Biography page at Museum of Civilization website, archived copy
George F. MacDonald profile and books at  BC BookWorld

2020 deaths
1938 births
Yale University alumni
University of Toronto alumni
Canadian curators
Canadian archaeologists
Canadian civil servants